The Massif du Nord is the longest mountain range of Haiti.

Geography
The Plaine-du-Nord lies along the northern border with the Dominican Republic, between the Massif du Nord and the North Atlantic Ocean.

It is the western extension of the Cordillera Central that runs through the Dominican Republic. This channel extends to the northwest under the name of the Chaîne du Haut-Piton. 

A narrow northern coastal plain lies north of the range on the Caribbean Sea. The Guayamouc River flows south from the range. 

History
After the Haitian Revolution, the Citadelle Laferrière was built by King Henri Christophe.

See also

References

Mountain ranges of Haiti
Artibonite (department)
Nord (Haitian department)